Viktor Paço (born 7 December 1971 in Vlorë) is an Albanian retired international football player.

Club career
A much-travelled striker, Paço has played for hometown club Flamurtari as well as in Greece, Cyprus, Slovenia, Croatia, Israël, Turkey and the United States. He was topscorer in the interrupted 1996–97 Albanian Superliga season with 14 goals in 13 matches without playing in the play-off finals as he had already left the club for Slovenian side Maribor Branik during the 1997 Pyramid crisis.

International career
He made his debut for Albania in an October 1996 FIFA World Cup qualification match against Portugal in Tirana and earned a total of 4 caps, scoring no goals. His final international was an August 1997 World Cup qualification match away against Ukraine.

Personal life
Currently he lives in the United States with his wife Enkela and their two children, where he is coaching youth soccer in the Rochester, New York area.

Honours
Albanian Superliga: 1
 1991

References

External sources
 
 Profile at TFF.

1971 births
Living people
Footballers from Vlorë
Albanian footballers
Association football forwards
Albania international footballers
Flamurtari Vlorë players
Atlético Madrid B players
Proodeftiki F.C. players
Nea Salamis Famagusta FC players
AEK Larnaca FC players
NK Maribor players
HNK Hajduk Split players
Hapoel Jerusalem F.C. players
Maccabi Haifa F.C. players
Beitar Jerusalem F.C. players
Hapoel Haifa F.C. players
Kocaelispor footballers
Rochester New York FC players
Kategoria Superiore players
Cypriot First Division players
Slovenian PrvaLiga players
Croatian Football League players
Liga Leumit players
Israeli Premier League players
Süper Lig players
Albanian expatriate footballers
Expatriate footballers in Spain
Expatriate footballers in Greece
Expatriate footballers in Cyprus
Expatriate footballers in Slovenia
Expatriate footballers in Croatia
Expatriate footballers in Israel
Expatriate footballers in Turkey
Expatriate soccer players in the United States
Albanian expatriate sportspeople in Spain
Albanian expatriate sportspeople in Greece
Albanian expatriate sportspeople in Cyprus
Albanian expatriate sportspeople in Slovenia
Albanian expatriate sportspeople in Croatia
Albanian expatriate sportspeople in Israel
Albanian expatriate sportspeople in Turkey
Albanian expatriate sportspeople in the United States